Lim Kah Wai is a Malaysian film director based in Osaka, Japan. He is best known for his work on the films Magic and Loss, Fly Me to Minami and No Where, Now Here.

Career
Lim's debut feature film, After All These Years, is a suspense film, starring Wenchao He and Massa Dazhong. His second film, Magic and Loss, starring Kim Kkot-bi and Kiki Sugino, premiered at the Busan International Film Festival. His third film, New World   (Shinsekai Story), starring Tomonaga Koumei and Shi Ka, premiered at the Hong Kong International Film Festival.

In 2013, Lim made his fourth film, Fly Me to Minami, starring Sherine Wong, Kenji Kohashi and Baek Seol Ah which screened at the Vancouver Asian Film Festival. The film was nominated for Grand Prix at the Osaka Asian Film Festival. His fifth directorial, Love in Late Autumn, starring Irene Wan, Patrick Tam and Charmaine Fong was released in 2016. His sixth film, No Where, Now Here, premiered at the Osaka Asian Film Festival in 2018. His most recent film, Somewhen Somewhere, premiered at the Osaka Asian Film Festival in 2019.

Filmography

References

External links 
 

Living people
Malaysian film directors
Malaysian screenwriters
Year of birth missing (living people)